Dexter Air Taxi is a Russian air taxi service operating distances of up to 2000 kilometres, it aims to have its services cover the whole of Russia. Sabre Holdings is assisting the operation with ambitions of more than 250 4-6 seater aircraft deployed and over 1500 departures a day

Destinations

As of September 2017, Dexter Air Taxi did not serve any domestic destinations:.

Fleet

References

External links

Official website (in Russian)

Airlines of Russia
Companies based in Moscow